Violet Sampa-Bredt (27 October 1950 – 29 March 2015, Germany) was a Zambian politician, the Patriotic Front member of National Assembly of Zambia for Chawama, and also General Secretary of the Council of Churches in Zambia.

She was:
 first ordained female Minister in the United Church of Zambia
 General Secretary Council of Churches in Zambia
 Member of National Assembly of Zambia 2006 to 2011

She was awarded the 1971 Winifred Kiek Scholarship

References

Members of the National Assembly of Zambia
1950 births
2015 deaths